Taylor Yard is the site of the Rio de Los Angeles State Park along with the new Metrolink maintenance facility located on the southern end of the former yard grounds in Los Angeles. The former railway station and classification yard and former headquarters of Southern Pacific Railroad operations in Southern California was purchased by the Southern Pacific in 1911 and continually reshaped and remade over the course of the early 20th century for the purposes of inspection, repair, and storage of freight cars on the Southern Pacific Fruit Express line.

History 
Taylor Yard was established in 1911 on the previous site of Taylor Feed Mill (from which the yard gets its name). It was rebuilt in 1949. Competition from the trucking industry and the closure of American manufacturing plants led to the decline of the Yard after the 1950s. In 1983, an average of 25,000 railroad cars moved through Taylor Yard and 1,200 workers were employed in its operations, down from 5,000 in the 1950s. Southern Pacific closed the terminal on November 14, 1985, citing declining business. Workers and union leaders cited a merger plan between Southern Pacific and Santa Fe Railway, which had been sharply criticized by the U.S. Justice Department, but endorsed by the U.S. Department of Transportation.

The Southern Pacific closed the facilities and bulldozed the site in 1988. In 1991, the county acquired the eastern portion of the site.

In 2003, the California Department of Parks and Recreation began working with the community to develop the Rio de Los Angeles State Park.

In 2017, the city acquired G2 parcel, the northern portion of Taylor Yard.

Developments

"Rumblefish" Taylor Yard Bikeway and Pedestrian Bridge 
In June 2019, the City of Los Angeles began construction on the "Rumblefish" Taylor Yard Bikeway and Pedestrian Bridge to connect Taylor Ward with Elysian Valley on the west side of the Los Angeles River. The bridge is part of Los Angeles River Revitalization Master Plan. The $20.8 million project has been wholly funded by Los Angeles County Metropolitan Transportation Authority.

Taylor Yard G2 River Park 
The Taylor Yard G2 River Park will be built on a  site acquired by the city in 2017 for $60 million. The park is intended to be provide recreational park space, wetlands and other amenities, and has been described by Mayor Eric Garcetti as the "crown jewel" of a broader ongoing initiative to restore  of the Los Angeles River. The park is expected to be completed by 2028, in time for the 2028 Summer Olympics. In July 2019, the city announced 3 design proposals for the park, namely The Island, Soft Edge, and the Yard. A viewing platform will be built to enable the public to view changes to the river habitat prior to the 2028 opening.

Paseo del Río project 
The project is being overseen by the 100 Acre Partnership, and will be funded by grants from the Santa Monica Mountains Conservancy.

Bowtie Parcel 

There are plans to convert this parcel into phase 2 of the phase two of Rio de Los Angeles State Park. The state currently uses the space for public art programming, and the site also hosts several site-specific installations, and numerous pop-up events, in collaboration with a local nonprofit, Clockshop.

Private developments 
The development comprises rental apartments, senior housing, homes, commercial space and greenspace.

In Spring 2020, a developer proposed the construction of a mixed-used complex immediately north of the Bowtie Parcel, comprising 419 multi-family residential units, commercial space, and a multi-story parking structure.

Ecology 
Taylor Yard sits adjacent to the Los Angeles River. As the river passes Taylor Yard, it flows through the Glendale Narrows. This portion of the river has an unlined channel bottom due to the high groundwater table. The soft-bottom includes riparian vegetation, open water, and sand bars, which are supported by year-round flows.

Architecture 
Among the most iconic features of the site was the Roundhouse and the Dayton Tower. The Dayton is the only building of the site that has not been demolished. It has been relocated three times.

By the 1950s, Taylor Yard was the central node in the freight network into and out of Los Angeles for Southern Pacific, as the classification yard had grown in complexity and size concurrent with increases both manufacturing and the overall population of Los Angeles. The Classification Yard was split into three operational zones, "with the receiving unit at the west end, then the classification unit, and at the east end the departure unit."

Environmental investigations 

Soil mapping reveals four areas of potential concern (AOPCs) which exhibit high concentrations of lead, hydrocarbons, arsenic, and antimony. The first AOPC area surrounds the former diesel turntable, the second envelops the former fueling and sanding tracks, the third sits along the southern portion of the former roundhouse, and the fourth is located near the diesel shops.

"Results of environmental investigations conducted at Taylor Yard to date indicate that subsurface soils in the Active Yard generally consist of fill material extending from the ground surface to a depth of approximately seven feet below ground surface (bgs), and sands and silty sands with minor discontinuous clayey sands extending from seven to 35 feet bgs." Additionally, there is an extensive infrastructure consisting of thirty onsite wells, twenty-two of which are located in the active yard, to monitor the quantity and quality of groundwater on-site.

References

Further reading 

Former Southern Pacific Railroad stations in California
History of Los Angeles
Glassell Park, Los Angeles
Los Angeles River